Sturgeon Bay High School is a public high school located in Sturgeon Bay, Wisconsin. It is part of the Sturgeon Bay School District.

Athletics 
Sturgeon Bay's athletic teams are known as the Clippers, and compete primarily in the Packerland Conference of the Wisconsin Interscholastic Athletic Association. The Clippers have won 14 WIAA state championships. Sturgeon Bay played football in the MONLPC (Marinette and Oconto, Northern Lakes, and Packerland) league until 2019, when low numbers forced them to move to eight-man football, where they play independently due to the school being too large to participate in eight-man football playoffs.

Notable alumni 
 Chris Greisen, football player
 Nick Greisen, football player
 Lawrence Johnson, politician
 Anna Augusta Von Helmholtz-Phelan, professor, author
 Casey Rabach, football player
 Lloyd Wasserbach, football player

References 

Public high schools in Wisconsin
Schools in Door County, Wisconsin